The Spray Lakes Group is a stratigraphic unit that is present on the western edge of the Western Canada Sedimentary Basin in the southern Canadian Rockies, and it comprises the Pennsylvanian-age strata of that region. It was named after the Spray Lakes near Banff, Alberta, and fossils of marine invertebrates are found in some of its strata.

Stratigraphy and lithology
The Spray Lakes Group comprises the quartzose sandstones of the Tunnel Mountain Formation and its equivalents in the lower part, and the dolomites and limestones of the Kananaskis Formation in the upper part. It is unconformably overlain by the Permian-age strata of the Ishbel Group, and underlain by the Late Mississippian strata of the Rundle Group.

Thickness and distribution
The Spray Lakes Group is present in the southern Canadian Rockies and reaches a maximum thickness of more than 600 metres (2000 feet) in the westernmost front ranges.

References

Carboniferous Alberta